Josef Cerny may refer to:

Josef Černý, born 1939, retired ice hockey player who played in the Czechoslovak Extraliga
Josef Černý, born 1943, Czech painter
Josef Černý, born 1993, Czech professional racing cyclist